In mathematics, in the realm of group theory, the term complemented group is used in two distinct, but similar ways.

In , a complemented group is one in which every subgroup has a group-theoretic complement.

The following are equivalent for any finite group G:
 G is complemented
 G is a subgroup of a direct product of groups of square-free order (a special type of Z-group)
 G is a supersolvable group with elementary abelian Sylow subgroups (a special type of A-group), .

Hall's definition required in addition that H and K permute, that is, that HK = { hk : h in H, k in K } form a subgroup. The Frattini subgroup of a K-group is trivial; if a group has a core-free maximal subgroup that is a K-group, then it itself is a K-group; hence subgroups of K-groups need not be K-groups, but quotient groups and direct products of K-groups are K-groups, . In  it is shown that every finite simple group is a complemented group. Note that in the classification of finite simple groups, K-group is more used to mean a group whose proper subgroups only have composition factors amongst the known finite simple groups.

An example of a group that is not complemented (in either sense) is the cyclic group of order p2, where p is a prime number. This group only has one nontrivial subgroup H, the cyclic group of order p, so there can be no other subgroup L to be the complement of H.

References
  
 
 
 

 

Properties of groups